Kentrocapros is a genus of deepwater boxfishes native to coastal waters of the Indian and Pacific Oceans.

Species
There are currently 5 recognized species in this genus:
 Kentrocapros aculeatus (Houttuyn, 1782)
 Kentrocapros eco (Phillipps, 1932)
 Kentrocapros flavofasciatus (Kamohara, 1938)
 Kentrocapros rosapinto (J. L. B. Smith, 1949) (Basketfish)
 Kentrocapros spilonota (C. H. Gilbert, 1905)

References

Aracanidae
Marine fish genera
Taxa named by Johann Jakob Kaup